The decade of the 1380s in art involved some significant events.

Events
 c.1380: Chinese painter Wang Meng is erroneously accused of conspiring against the Hongwu Emperor and spends the remaining five years of his life in jail.
 1388: Publication in early Ming dynasty China of the Ko Ku Yao Lun ("The Essential Criteria of Antiquities").

Works
 c. 1380s: Agnolo Gaddi works on painting The Coronation of the Virgin, The Finding of the True Cross and Madonna Enthroned with Saints and Angels
 1381: Jaime Serra completes Descent into Hell
 c. 1383: Master Bertram of Minden paints the Grabow Altarpiece
 1381–5: Hermann von Münster produces for Metz Cathedral in the Duchy of Lorraine the stained glass tympanum of the west façade and the rose window
 1389: Hermann Ruissel crafts the Three Brothers (jewel)

Births
 1388: Xia Chang – Chinese painter during the Ming Dynasty (died 1470)
 1388: Dai Jin – founder of the Zhe School of Ming dynasty painting (died 1462)
 1385: Johan Limbourg – Dutch Renaissance miniature painter (died 1416)
 1387: Parri Spinelli – Italian (Tuscan) painter of the early renaissance (died 1453)
 1386: Donatello – early Renaissance Italian artist and sculptor from Florence (died 1466)
 1386: Paul Limbourg – Dutch Renaissance miniature painter (died 1416)
 1385: Herman Limbourg – Dutch Renaissance miniature painter (died 1416)
 1385: Michelino Molinari da Besozzo – Italian painter (died 1445)
 1384: Nanni di Banco – Italian sculptor from Florence (died 1421)
 1383: Masolino da Panicale – Italian painter (died 1447)
 1380: Hans von Tübingen – Austrian artist (died 1462)

Deaths
 1389: Luca di Tommè – Italian tempera painter (born 1330)
 1385: Wáng Méng – Chinese painter during the Yuan dynasty (born 1308)
 1381: Jean de Liège – French sculptor (born 1330)
 1380: Jacopo del Casentino – Italian painter active mainly in Tuscany (born 1330)

References

 
Years of the 14th century in art
Art